5th BSFC Awards
January 20, 1985

Best Film: 
 The Killing Fields 
The 5th Boston Society of Film Critics Awards honored the best filmmaking of 1984. The awards were given on 20 January 1985.

Winners
Best Film:
The Killing Fields
Best Actor:
Haing S. Ngor – The Killing Fields
Best Actress:
Judy Davis – A Passage to India
Best Supporting Actor:
John Malkovich – The Killing Fields and Places in the Heart
Best Supporting Actress:
Peggy Ashcroft – A Passage to India
Best Director:
Bertrand Tavernier – A Sunday in the Country (Un dimanche à la campagne)
Best Screenplay:
Alex Cox – Repo Man
Best Cinematography:
Chris Menges – The Killing Fields
Best Documentary:
The Times of Harvey Milk
Best Foreign-Language Film:
A Sunday in the Country (Un dimanche à la campagne) • France

External links
Past Winners

References 
1984 Boston Society of Film Critics Awards Internet Movie Database

1984
1984 film awards
1984 awards in the United States
Boston
January 1985 events in the United States